Dr. Agarwal's Eye Hospital is a chain of eye specialty hospitals in India, headquartered at Chennai. Started by Jaiveer Agarwal with his wife Tahira Agarwal as an eye care centre in Chennai, it has grown to 103 centres across India and 15 centres overseas.

Amar Agarwal is the chairman and managing director of Dr. Agarwal's Eye Hospital.

Founder
Jaiveer Agarwal born on 24 September 1930 along with his family members lead this hospital. He was the founder and chairperson of this hospital and also the recipient of the national award Padma Bhushan from APJ Abdul Kalam in March, 2006. His wife Tahira Agarwal and son Amar Agarwal are both ophthalmologists. Jaiveer Agarwal died on 16 November 2009.

Centres

India

Dr. Agarwal's Eye Hospital has 16 branches each in Chennai and 16 in rest of Tamil Nadu, eleven branches in Bengaluru, 8 branches in Hyderabad (Telangana - Dilsukhnagar, Gachibowli, Himayat Nagar, Madeenaguda, Mehdipatnam, Panjagutta (Hyderabad Main Hospital), Santhosh Nagar, Secunderabad), 5 in Andhra Pradesh (Guntur, Nellore, Tirupati, Rajahmundry and Visakhapatnam (Main), one branch each in Jaipur (Rajasthan), Port Blair, Two branches in Kerala (Thiruvananthapuram & Kottayam), two branches in Kolkata, three branches in the rest of Karnataka (Hubli and Mysore),two branches in Odisha (Cuttack and Bhubaneswar), 4 branches in Maharastra (Pune, Vashi and Chembur), 3 branches in Madhya pradesh ( Janjirwala, Anapurna, Astha and 6 branch in Gujarat (Ahmedabad,Bhavnagar,Surat 
and Vapi).

On 6 November 2019, a new facility is launched at Raja Rajeswari Nagar, Bengaluru.

On 5 August 2022, it announced the acquisition of five hospitals in Maharashtra.

Overseas
Dr. Agarwal's Eye Hospital has one branch in Ghana (Accra), one branch in Kenya (Nairobi), one branch in Madagascar (Anatananarivo), three branches in Mauritius (Ebene, Centre De Flacq and Goodlands), two branches in Mozambique (Beira and Maputo), one branch in Nigeria (Kaduna), two branches in Rwanda (Kigali and Rusizi), one branch in Tanzania (Dar Es Salaam), one branch in Uganda (Kampala) and two in Zambia (Kitwe and Lusaka).

See also
 Healthcare in Chennai

References 

Hospital networks in India
Hospitals in India
Eye care in India
Eye hospitals in India
Hospitals in Tamil Nadu
Hospitals in Chennai
1957 establishments in Madras State
Hospitals established in 1957
Companies listed on the Bombay Stock Exchange